Julie Aagaard Poulsen (born 30 January 1992) is a Danish handball player who currently plays for EH Aalborg. She was a member of the Danish junior national team that won the 2011 European Under-19 Handball Championships in August 2011 in the Netherlands, in the final match against the home team as the second most productive player of the winning team.

References

1992 births
Living people
Danish female handball players
People from Brønderslev
Sportspeople from the North Jutland Region